Christian De Dionigi is an Italian slalom canoeist who has competed at the international level since 2013.

He won a gold medal in the Extreme K1 event at the 2018 ICF Canoe Slalom World Championships in Rio de Janeiro.

World Cup individual podiums

1 World Championship counting for World Cup points

References

External links

Living people
Italian male canoeists
Medalists at the ICF Canoe Slalom World Championships
1992 births
21st-century Italian people